Japan nuclear may refer to:

 2011 Japanese nuclear accidents
 Japanese nuclear incidents
 Nuclear power in Japan
 Japanese nuclear weapon program

See also
 Japan's non-nuclear weapons policy